Dr. Boyi Bhimanna (19 September 1911 – 16 December 2005), transliterated alternatively as Bheemanna or Bheemana, was a Telugu poet.

Early life 
Bhimanna was born in a poor Dalit family in Mamidikuduru village, East Godavari District of Andhra Pradesh in 1911. He participated in the Quit India Movement. He wrote a book called "Gudiselu Kaalipothunnay

Writings 
He was influenced by the teachings of Mahatma Gandhi and Dr. B. R. Ambedkar. His writings reflected the angst of the down-trodden. He wore several hats such as that of a writer, poet, journalist and academician. He was a member of the senate of Andhra University. He was the director of the Andhra Pradesh state translation division for some time.

He wrote in English, as well, and the work entitled Seventh Season, a collection of his English poetry, was well-received. He wrote over seventy books in his career, with the work Gudiselu Kaalipothunnaayi (English:The Huts are Burning) being the most popular.

Bheemana written many literature works some of the most popular among them are Paleru, Janabaduni Jabulu, Dharmamkosam Poratam etc. 

Among all great literature works Paleru is the main icon which brought changes in many poor and dalit families. Many backward caste parents started joining their children in school for better and beautiful future.

Selected list of works 
 Gudiselu Kaalipothunnaai
 Naku Telisina Jashuva
 Bhimanna Ugadulu
 Rajakiya Veerudu Dr. Khan
 Paleru (play)
 Pilli Satakam
 Paleru nunchi Padmasri Varaku (auto-biography)
  janabhaduni jabulu
  Kooli Raju
  Ragavaasishtam
  Dharmam Kosam Poratam
  Raga Vaisakhi
  Deepa Sabha
  Raabheelu
  Ragodayam
  Madhubala
  Madhugeetha
  Naa Oohalalo Valmiki
  Bhimanna Shankharavam
  Gilli Cheptunna
  Idigo, Idee Bhagavadgeetha
  Chatuvulu- Swagathaalu
  Entha Cheekati Enni Deepaalu
  Kukka Morugutoone Undi
  Srisri Communistu Kaadu
  Baalayogeeyam
  The Seventh Season
  Paramaatma
  Drug Addictulu
  Anaadi kosam nunchi Anantatvam loki
  Manavuni Maroka Majili
  Chandaalika
  Pairu Paata
  Ambedkara Suprabhatam
  Ambedkara Matham
  Mani Manasam
  Panchama Swaram
  Sivalakalu
  God the Drug
  Veda Vyasudu
  Dharma Vyadhudu
  Pragathi
  Jagat Satyam Brahma Mithya
  Oyi Kavi Kavitvam Raayi
  Bhimanna Kavya Kusumaalu

Awards 
He won several awards, including the Sahitya Akademi Puraskar for Gudiselu Kaalipothunnaayi in 1975. He was honoured by the Government of India with the fourth and third highest civilian awards in the country, namely the Padma Shri and the Padma Bhushan in 1973 and 2001, respectively.

Bhimanna was also awarded the title Kala Prapoorna (honorary doctorate) by Andhra University. From 1978 to 1984, he was a member of the Andhra Pradesh Legislative Council.

He was awarded Kala Ratna Award from Andhra Pradesh Government in 2003.
In 1992, Telugu University conferred a special award on him and in 1996, the state government awarded him the Atma Gauravam Puraskaram (English: Self-Respect Award).

Bhimanna also received the prestigious Raja-Lakshmi Literary Award from the Sri Raja-Lakshmi Foundation in Chennai for the year 1991, as well as the Loknayak Award.

Death 
He suffered from Parkinson's disease and, after a period of ailment, died at the Nizam's Institute of Medical Sciences in Hyderabad.

References 

 Cover story from Eenadu (Pages 1 & 2) and editorial (Page 4) dated 17 December 2005.
 News item about his death

1911 births
2005 deaths
Indian independence activists from Andhra Pradesh
Journalists from Andhra Pradesh
Telugu poets
Recipients of the Sahitya Akademi Award in Telugu
Recipients of the Kala Ratna
Recipients of the Padma Shri in literature & education
Recipients of the Padma Bhushan in literature & education
Neurological disease deaths in India
Deaths from Parkinson's disease
Telugu writers
People from East Godavari district
20th-century Indian poets